This is a list of the National Register of Historic Places listings in Grand Forks County, North Dakota. This is intended to be a complete list of the properties and districts on the National Register of Historic Places in Grand Forks County, North Dakota, United States. The locations of National Register properties and districts for which the latitude and longitude coordinates are included below, may be seen in an online map.

With 73 properties and districts listed on the National Register, Grand Forks County has more listings than any of the state's other 52 counties.

The city of Grand Forks has been damaged by floods and fires numerous times, including by floods of the Red River, overflowing its banks in record floods in 1882, 1893, 1897, 1950, 1965, 1966, 1969, 1975, 1978, and 1979."  Many of the historic buildings listed on the National Register date from the 1890s period. Many buildings of that era were designed by architects Joseph Bell DeRemer and others; over 60 percent of the commercial buildings were built by the Dinnie Brothers, bricklayers. Other notable architects whose work is reflected in the listings include: Buechner & Orth, Theodore B. Wells, George Hancock and John W. Ross.

A large number of buildings were identified as worth preserving in a 1981 study of Downtown Grand Forks historical resources.
  This led to many individual buildings being NRHP-listed, and to the listing of several large historic districts. The 1997 flood and fire destroyed some of the National Register-listed buildings.

In 2005, despite the flood and fire damage to the area, the Downtown Grand Forks Historic District was listed. The most recent listings, in 2010, are the University of North Dakota Historic District and WPA Stone Structures in Memorial Park and Calvary Cemetery, and in 2011, The Kegs Drive-In.

A large number of the listings were prepared by Dr. Norene Roberts, of North Dakota State University. Additional notes for many are archived at the university.

Current listings

|}

Former listings

|}

See also

List of National Historic Landmarks in North Dakota
National Register of Historic Places listings in North Dakota

References

Grand Forks